National Route 422 is a national highway of Japan connecting Ōtsu, Shiga and Kihoku, Mie in Japan, with a total length of 163 km (101.28 mi).

References

National highways in Japan
Roads in Mie Prefecture
Roads in Nara Prefecture
Roads in Shiga Prefecture